Moshe Matalon may refer to:
 Moshe Matalon (politician)
 Moshe Matalon (engineer)